Carl Adam Andersson (born 11 November 1996) is a Swedish footballer who plays as a left-back for Randers FC, on loan from Rosenborg. He is the twin brother of Joel Andersson who plays for FC Midtjylland.

International
Adam Andersson made his debut for the Sweden national football team on 8 January 2019 in a friendly against Finland, as a 64th-minute substitute for Jonathan Augustinsson.

Career statistics

Club

References

External links
 
 
 

1996 births
Living people
Swedish footballers
Swedish expatriate footballers
Sweden international footballers
Association football midfielders
Footballers from Gothenburg
Allsvenskan players
Västra Frölunda IF players
BK Häcken players
Rosenborg BK players
Randers FC players
Swedish expatriate sportspeople in Norway
Swedish expatriate sportspeople in Denmark
Expatriate footballers in Norway
Expatriate men's footballers in Denmark